In chemistry thiadiazoles are a sub-family of azole compounds, with the name thiadiazole originating from the Hantzsch–Widman nomenclature. Structurally, they are five-membered heterocyclic compounds containing one sulfur and two nitrogen atoms. They are aromatic ring by virtue of their two double bonds and the sulfur lone pair. Four possible structures exist depending on the relative positions of the heteroatoms; these forms do not interconvert and hence are structural isomers and not tautomers. The compounds themselves are rarely synthesized and possess no particular application, however compounds bearing them as a structural motif are fairly common in pharmacology.

References

 
Functional groups